This is a list of villages and settlements in Rivers State, Nigeria arranged by local government area(LGA) and district/area (with postal codes also given).

By postal code
Below is a well arranged list of polling units which includes villages and schools arranged according to postal code.

By electoral ward
Below is a list of polling units, including villages and schools, organised by electoral ward.

References

Rivers
Villages
Geography of Rivers State